The Sunda owlet (Taenioptynx sylvaticus) is a small owl from Borneo and Sumatra.

This species was formerly treated as a subspecies of the collared owlet (Taenioptynx brodiei). It was promoted to a separate species based largely on the basis of a difference in vocalisation.

There are two subspecies:

 T. s. sylvaticus (Bonaparte, 1850) - montane Sumatra
 T. s. borneensis (Sharpe, 1893) - montane Borneo

References

Further reading

Duncan, James R. (2003) Owls of the World: Their Lives, Behavior and Survival. Firefly Books

Sunda owlet
Birds of Sumatra
Birds of Borneo
Sunda owlet
Sunda owlet